Veronica Linklater, Baroness Linklater of Butterstone (15 April 1943 – 15 December 2022) was a British Liberal Democrat politician and member of the House of Lords. Her career indicates her interests in children's welfare, education and special needs, and prison reform.

Linklater was the daughter of Lieutenant-Colonel Archibald Michael Lyle and Hon. Elizabeth Sinclair, younger daughter of the former Leader of the Liberal Party Archibald Sinclair, 1st Viscount Thurso. Her first cousin, John Sinclair, 3rd Viscount Thurso, was an elected Liberal Democrat MP for the seat of Caithness, Sutherland and Easter Ross. She was educated at Cranborne Chase School, a former boarding independent school for girls situated at New Wardour Castle, near Tisbury, Wiltshire, followed by the Universities of Sussex and London. In 1967, she married the journalist Magnus Linklater; they had three children, two sons and one daughter.

In 1967, she became a Child Care Officer for the London Borough of Tower Hamlets, and between 1970 and 1985, she became governor to three Islington schools. From 1971 to 1977, she co-founded the Visitors' Centre at Pentonville Prison, and her continuing interest in this field led to her involvement with the Winchester Prison Project, Prison Reform Trust from 1981 to 1982. She was a trustee of the Esmée Fairbairn Foundation.

In 1992, she turned her parents mansion house in Butterstone into a school for children with special needs called the New School. She was inspired to set up the school after struggling to find an appropriate school for her daughter, Freya, who has cerebral palsy and struggled with mainstream education.

She stood for the Liberal Democrats in the 1995 Perth and Kinross by-election, finishing fourth. She was created a life peer as Baroness Linklater of Butterstone, of Riemore in Perth and Kinross, in the 1997 Prime Minister's Resignation Honours. She retired in February 2016 following the House of Lords Reform Act 2014.  

Linklater died from complications of Alzheimer's disease in Dunkeld, on 15 December 2022, at the age of 79.

Arms

References

Sources
Profile, hansard.millbanksystems.com; accessed 20 March 2014.
Biography, parliament.uk; accessed 20 March 2014.

1943 births
2022 deaths
Alumni of the University of Sussex
Alumni of the University of London
Veronica
Liberal Democrats (UK) life peers
Life peeresses created by Elizabeth II
People educated at Cranborne Chase School
Place of birth missing
Liberal Democrats (UK) parliamentary candidates
Deaths from Alzheimer's disease